André Messelis (17 February 1931 – 17 February 2022) was a Belgian professional racing cyclist. He won the E3 Harelbeke in 1962. Messelis died on 17 February 2022, at the age of 91.

References

External links

1931 births
2022 deaths
Belgian male cyclists
People from Ledegem
Sportspeople from West Flanders
20th-century Belgian people